Melica spectabilis is a species of grass known by the common names purple oniongrass and showy oniongrass.

Distribution
It is native to western North America from British Columbia to northern California to the Rocky Mountains, where it grows in moist meadows, forests, and other mountainous habitat.

Description
Melica spectabilis is a perennial grass which varies in maximum height from under  to nearly a meter, growing from rhizomes and stalked, onionlike corms. The inflorescence is a narrow series of spikelets which are green with evenly spaced purple bands.

External links
Jepson Manual Treatment - Melica spectabilis
Grass Manual Treatment
Melica spectabilis - Photo gallery

spectabilis
Grasses of the United States
Grasses of Canada
Native grasses of California
Flora of the Western United States
Flora of British Columbia
Flora of the West Coast of the United States
Flora of the Klamath Mountains
Natural history of the California Coast Ranges